The Brother of Daphne is a 1914 collection of comic short stories by the English author Dornford Yates (Cecil William Mercer), the first book published under the pen name he had been using for magazine pieces since 1910. This was also the first book to feature the group of characters that featured in many of his future works: Bertram ('Berry') Pleydell, his wife and cousin Daphne Pleydell, Daphne's brother Boy Pleydell, another cousin Jonathan ('Jonah') Mansel, and Jonah's younger sister Jill Mansel.  The group of five - Berry, Daphne, Boy, Jonah and Jill - later came to be known collectively as 'Berry and Co'.

The short stories in the collection were originally published in The Windsor Magazine, their publication in book form having been suggested to Mercer by the Windsor'''s editor Arthur Hutchinson.

 Contents 
Fifteen short stories recounting the comic adventures of Boy, Daphne, Berry, Jonah and Jill, set in Hampshire, Devon, The Cotswolds, and Austria. They are narrated in the first person by Boy.

 Background 

Mercer was living in London and working as a barrister at the time these stories were written. He had sold short stories previously to Punch (1910), The Harmsworth Red magazine (1910) and Pearson's Magazine (1910 and 1912) before developing a working relationship with The Windsor Magazine that continued (with breaks during the war years and between 1929 and 1935) until the magazine's final issue in 1939. The Berry family characters first appear in "The Babes in the Wood" in Pearson's in September 1910, in a story that has never appeared in book form.

 Chapters 

 Illustrations 

The first edition of the book, published in 1914, included plates of the illustrations by George Cecil Wilmshurst (1873-1930), originally included in The Windsor Magazine serialisations, for the stories included as chapters 2, 4, 6, 9, 10, 11, 12, 13, 14 and 15. The illustration from Chapter 15 "All Found" was also used on the dustjacket of the first edition. Wilmshurst's illustrations for chapters 5 and 7, and the illustrations by the three artists from the 1911 serialisations, were not included in the book. The book was reprinted in 1920, and that and subsequent editions did not include any illustrations.

 Dedication 

 "To Her. Who smiles for me, though I essay no jest, Whose eyes are glad at my coming, though I bring her no gift, Who suffers me readily, though I do her no honour, My Mother."

 Critical reception 
The book was reviewed favourably by Punch in August 1914. The reviewer called the stories "agreeable nonsense", in which the narrator "apparently could not go out for the simplest walk without meeting some amiable young woman, divinely fair and supernaturally witty, with whom he presently exchanged airy badinage".

Dramatisation

An episode of the ITV Hannay series, "A Point of Honour", was based on the eponymous story published as Chapter IX of  The Brother of Daphne'', but the source was uncredited.

References

Bibliography
 
 

1914 short story collections
Ward, Lock & Co. books
Short story collections by Dornford Yates